Ymär Abdrahim (Mishar Dialect: Үмәр Әбдрәхим - né Abdrahimoff - Literary Tatar: Гомәр Габдрәхимов, Ğömər Ğəbdrəximov; 24 March 1882 - 26 March 1975) was a Tatar entrepreneur, who had his own successful haberdashery/fabric shop in Helsinki. Abdrahim was born in Russian Empire.

Life 

Ymär Abdrahim (Ümär Äbdrähim) was born in Russian Empire, Nizhny Novgorod Governorate.
Abdrahim opened his own haberdashery/fabric shop in 1911. It was located in Punavuori, Helsinki. Before this, Abdrahim's uncle had already had business in the city. 

Abdrahim was also involved in the forming of The Finnish-Islamic Congregation.

After he got married and obtained Finnish citizenship, he brought his family to Finland. He had fourteen children in total, of which some had been born in Russia, others in Finland. He had them with two women, the first one died due to an illness. Six of Abdrahim's children fought for Finland in World War II: sons Osman and Hasan on the front, daughters Fazie, Hatime, Safiye and Sadri as food and medicine Lottas. Hasan died at war. As a civilian, Osman was for example a chairman of a Tatar sportsclub called Yolduz and also an honorary member of The Finnish-Islamic Congregation.

Literature

 Bedretdin, Kadriye (reporter): Tugan Tel: Kirjoituksia Suomen Tataareista. Suomen Itämainen Seura, Helsinki 2011. .

References

Citations 

Finnish Tatars
Finnish merchants
1882 births
1975 deaths
Tatar people from the Russian Empire